The Coldwater Beds are a geologic formation of the Okanagan Highlands in British Columbia, Canada. They preserve fossils dating back to the Ypresian stage of the Eocene period, or Wasatchian in the NALMA classification.

The formation comprises mudstones, shales and tuffs deposited in a lacustrine environment and has provided many insect fossils, as well as indeterminate birds and fossil flora.

Description 
The Coldwater Beds were defined by Dawson (1895) based on a section along the Coldwater River in the Okanagan Highlands. U-Pb dating of thick tephra, combined with Ar-Ar dates of sanidine from same bed provided an Early Eocene age. The tephra was deposited within insect-bearing shales.

Climate 

The Quilchena fossil locality is dated to 51.5 ± 0.4 Ma corresponding to the Early Eocene Climatic Optimum (EECO), and is reconstructed as the warmest and wettest of the Early Eocene upland sites from the Okanagan Highlands of British Columbia and northern Washington State. Using bioclimatic analysis of 45 nearest living relatives, a moist mesothermal climate is indicated (MAT ; cold month mean temperature (CMMT)  and mean annual precipitation (MAP) of /yr. Leaf size analysis estimates MAP at /y.

Fossils

A wide variety of fossils occur in the formation, including abundant fish remains, insects, and plants, and rare occurrences of molluscs, ostracods, and birds:

Flora 
Fossil plants were first reported from the Coldwater Beds at the Quilchena site and nearby by Penhallow (1908) with an expanded taxonomic list given by Mathewes et al (2016).

Pteridophytes
Azolla

Ginkgophytes
Ginkgo

Pinophytes
Abies
cf Amentotaxus
Calocedrus
Chamaecyparis
Glyptostrobus
Keteleeria
Metasequoia
Picea
Pinus
Pseudolarix
Sequoia
Taxodium
Thuja
Tsuga

Angiosperms
Acer
cf. Aesculus
†Alnus parvifolia
†Betula leopoldae
Bignoniaceae
†Castaneophyllum
†Comptonia columbiana
Cornus 
Corylopsis
Dipteronia
cf. Disanthus
†Eucommia montana
†Eucommia rolandii
cf. Exbucklandia
Fagus
†Florissantia quilchenensis
Fraxinus
Hovenia
†Joffrea/Nyssidium
Nyssa
Pieris
†Plafkeria
cf. Pterocarya
Rhus
cf. Sambucus
Sassafras
Ternstroemia
cf. Gordonia
Tilia
Trochodendron
†Ulmus okanaganensis

Pollen taxa

Ginkgophytes
Ginkgo

Pinophytes
Picea
Pinus
cf Sciadopitys
Tsuga

Angiosperms
Alnus
Carya
†Liliacidites
Liquidambar
†Pistillipollenites mcgregorii
cf. Platanus
Pterocarya
†Sabal ?florisanti
Tilia
Ulmus

Molluscs
Mark Wilson (1987) noted, without taxonomic identification, that unidentified small bivalves are a component of the Quilchena invertebrate paleofauna.

Insects 
The insect fossils studied by Wilson (1987) showed Bibionidae dominating the paleoentemofauna, at 28% of all specimens examined at that time.  An additional 13% of the fossils were other dipterans while up to 41% of all insects still had attached wings. The invertebrates trace fossils included two undescribed species of Trichoptera larval cases and burrowing or tracks in the sediment.

Blattaria
 Diplopterinae indet.
Coleoptera
 cf. Amara sp.
 †Buprestis saxigena 
 †Buprestis sepulta 
 †Buprestis tertiaria 
 Carabidae indet.
 †Cercyon? terrigena  
 Curculionidae indet.
 cf. Erotylidae indet.
 †Nebria paleomelas 
 Omaliinae indet.
 Pachymerina sp.
 Scarabaeoidea indet.
Dermaptera
 Forficulina indet.
Diptera
 Plecia angustipennis
 Plecia canadensis
 Plecia pictipennis
 Mycetophilidae indet.
 Pipunculidae indet.
 Pipunculinae indet.
 Pleciinae indet.
 Syrphidae indet.
 Tipulidae indet.
Hemiptera
 Telmatrechus defunctus
 Aphididae indet.
 Cercopoidea indet.
 Cicadellidae indet.
 Cydnidae indet.
 Gerridae indet.
 Megymeninae indet.
 cf. Pentatomidae indet.
Hymenoptera
 Eosphecium naumanni
 Halictus? savenyei
 Braconidae indet.
 Formicidae indet.
 Ichneumonidae indet.
 Tenthredinidae indet.
 Trigonalidae indet.
 Vespidae indet.
Mecoptera
 Eorpa jurgeni
 Eorpa sp.
 Panorpoidea sp.
Neuroptera
 Polystoechotites sp.
 Palaeopsychops dodgeorum
 Palaeopsychops douglasae
 Wesmaelius mathewesi
Orthoptera
 Prophalangopsidae indet.
Trichoptera
 Phryganeidae indet.
 Trichoptera indet.

Fish
Amia sp. scales
Amyzon brevipinne

Birds 
 Aves indet. feathers

Mammals
 Insectivorous mammalian indet. tooth

Correlations 

The formation has been correlated with the Eocene Okanagan Highlands floras including the Allenby Formation, Kamloops Group, Horsefly shales,  and Driftwood Canyon site of British Columbia, along with the Klondike Mountain Formation of Washington State.  Additionally its correlated with the Margaret Formation of Ellesmere Island, Nunavut, the Chickaloon Formation of Alaska, Wishbone, Chuckanut and Iceberg Bay Formations, all of similar age. The flora of the Coldwater Beds has been correlated to the Chu Chua Formation of southeastern British Columbia. The formation also correlates with the Springbrook, Kettle River and O'Brien Creek Formations in Washington, United States.

See also 
 List of fossiliferous stratigraphic units in British Columbia

References 

Ypresian North America
Paleontology in British Columbia
Coldwater Beds